The Badrutt's Palace Hotel is a historic luxury hotel in St. Moritz, Switzerland. The hotel opened in 1896 and has 155 rooms, of which 43 are suites. The majority shareholder is Anikó Badrutt.

 

The hotel has ten different restaurants three bars and one club: Le Restaurant and Le Relais which serve French cuisine and international cuisine; La Diala, which offers a light Mediterranean cuisine; Le Grand Hall, also known as 'The living room of St. Moritz', La Coupole-Matsuhisa by Nobuyuki Matsuhisa, which offers a fusion of Japanese and Peruvian cuisines in the former indoor tennis hall; IGNIV by Andreas Caminada with 2 Michelin Stars and an innovative take on plates for sharing; Paradiso Mountain Club & Restaurant, located in the Corvigla ski area it offers mountain comfort food, fun cocktails, and urban beats; Chesa Veglia, the oldest farmhouse in St. Moritz, built in 1658, with three additional restaurants; Patrizier Stuben, wish serves local and typical Swiss cuisine, Grill Chadafö, with grill specialities, Pizzeria Heuboden, offering the best pizza in town and Italian delicacies and two bars, Bar Carigiet and Bar Polo; iconic Renaissance Bar offering the finest cigars in the world, exceptional drinks and cocktails, and an inviting ambience; and King’s Social House with Jason Atherton’s modern interpretation of classic bistro fare, with dishes that are perfect to share, and later in the evening DJs and live performers guide guests through the night.

History

The history of the hotel and the family Badrutt started in 1856, when Johannes Badrutt bought a small guesthouse in St. Moritz and started to rebuild it, to create the Hotel Engadiner Kulm, which is today known as the Kulm Hotel St. Moritz. He had built an artificial coasting slide and a curling ground for his guests. In 1864, the son of Casper Badrutt bought the Hotel Beau Rivage in St. Moritz and altered it to create the Badrutt's Palace Hotel we see today. The official opening was in 1896 and two years later the son of Casper Badrutt, Hans Badrutt, took over the management.

 

Billy Fiske, an American fighter pilot killed in the Battle of Britain, who was a Cresta competitor, and a founder of the Aspen ski resort in Colorado, was well known for jumps from the Badrutt's Palace Hotel's bar chandelier.

 

The historic house, known as Chesa Veglia, was purchased in 1935–36 and converted into a restaurant. With the death of Hans Badrutt in 1953, the directorship passed on to his wife Helen and her son Andrea Badrutt, who later, together with his brother Hansjürg Badrutt, took over.

 

The historic tower and symbol of St. Moritz was rebuilt and refurbished after a fire in 1967. In 1969–70, a swimming pool and a fitness center were added to the hotel. After the extension of the Suot-Mulin-Complex between 1981 and 1984, which housed new suites and privately owned apartments, the management of Badrutt's Palace Hotel was transferred to the luxury hotel chain Rosewood Hotels and Resorts. During this period many renovations, extensions and technical installations were made that added to the substance and development of Badrutt's Palace Hotel. In the year 2000 a new spa area and a fitness centre opened. In 2002, the Serletta Shopping Centre, with international stores, opened beneath the hotel, this was later renamed the Palace Galerie. In 2003, the 280 m2 Hans Badrutt suite was completed, as was the 250 m2 Helen Badrutt suite with its marble bathrooms.

 

Since the retreat of the Rosewood group in April 2003, the Badrutt's Palace Hotel is being run as a private hotel again. In 2004, the hotelier, Hans Wiedemann, took over as managing director, together with Yves Gardiol as general manager. In 2006 (notarially 2008) the childless owners, Hansjürg and Anikó Badrutt (born 1930), bequeathed a two-thirds share of the hotel to Hans Wiedemann in their will. Hans Wiedemann remained at the helm until 2018 and appointed Richard Leuenberger as Managing Director, while he continues to serve on the board of the hotel.

References

 Badrutt's Palace Hotel website

External links

Badrutt's Palace Hotel website

A Winter Day at the Badrutt's Palace Hotel – a historic film from 1930

 

 

 

Luxury hotels

Hotels in Switzerland

Buildings and structures in Graubünden

Tourist attractions in Graubünden

History of Graubünden

St. Moritz

Cultural property of regional significance in Graubünden